Akdeğirmen (formerly: Kumarı) is a village in the Sinanpaşa District, Afyonkarahisar Province, Turkey. Its population is 109 (2021).

References

Villages in Sinanpaşa District